A Promise may refer to:

 A Promise (1986 film), a Japanese drama by Yoshishige Yoshida
 A Promise (1998 film), a South Korean film starring Park Shin-yang
 A Promise, a 2002 film starring Gordon Pinsent
 A Promise (2013 film), an English-language French romance by Patrice Leconte
 A Promise (Miriam Makeba album), 1974
 A Promise (Xiu Xiu album), 2003
 "A Promise" (song), a 1981 song by Echo & the Bunnymen

See also
 A Promise to Burn, a 2010 album by Framing Hanley
 Promise (disambiguation)
 The Promise (disambiguation)
 Promises, Promises (disambiguation)